Mohamad Nazaruddin bin Sabtu is a Malaysian politician and currently serves as Negeri Sembilan State Executive Councillor.

Election results

References 

Living people
People from Negeri Sembilan
Malaysian people of Malay descent
 People's Justice Party (Malaysia) politicians
21st-century Malaysian politicians
Year of birth missing (living people)
Members of the Negeri Sembilan State Legislative Assembly
 Negeri Sembilan state executive councillors